"Vaaste" is a Hindi song composed by Tanishk Bagchi with lyrics by Arafat Mehmood, performed by Dhvani Bhanushali and Nikhil D'Souza.

The song was released by T-Series on 6 April 2019 and produced by Bhushan Kumar. Its music video was directed by Radhika Rao and Vinay Sapru.

Reception 
The song became popular within days of its release, and Dhvani Bhanushali claimed that it had had over 50 million views on YouTube in a week. It had been viewed 115 million times on YouTube by the end of April 2019.

It was declared the 10th most liked music video worldwide on YouTube for 2019 and was also featured in YouTube Rewind 2019. It has more than 1.4 Billion views as of June 2022.

References

External links

2019 songs
2019 singles
Dhvani Bhanushali songs
Indian pop
Hindi songs
T-Series (company) singles
Songs written by Tanishk Bagchi
Songs with lyrics by Arafat Mehmood